A Wild Goose Chase is a 1919 American silent adventure film directed by Harry Beaumont and starring Matt Moore, Hazel Daly and Sidney Ainsworth.

Cast
 Hazel Daly as Margaret Sherwood
 Sidney Ainsworth		
 Chester Barnett	
 Matt Moore

References

Bibliography
 Nash, Jay Robert. The Motion Picture Guide 1988 Annual. Cinebooks, 1997.

External links
 

1919 films
1919 adventure films
American silent feature films
American adventure films
American black-and-white films
Films directed by Harry Beaumont
Triangle Film Corporation films
1910s English-language films
1910s American films
Silent adventure films